Pyropeltidae is a family of gastropods in the clade Vetigastropoda (according to the taxonomy of the Gastropoda by Bouchet & Rocroi, 2005).

This family has no subfamilies.

Habitat 
Their habitat includes hydrothermal vents and whale-fall habitats.

Genera 
Genera in the family Pyropeltidae include:
 Pyropelta McLean & Haszprunar, 1987

References

Further reading 
 McLean, J. H. (1992) "Cocculiniform limpets (Cocculinidae and Pyropeltidae) living on whale bone in the deep sea off California". J. Mollus. Stud 58: 401–414.